Willie Martinez is the name of:

Willie Martínez (baseball) (born 1978), baseball pitcher
Willie Martinez (jockey) (born 1971), horse racing jockey
Willie Martinez (American football) (born 1963), defensive backs coach

See also
William Martinez (disambiguation)